Wei (魏) is the English spelling of a Chinese surname.

Notable people surnamed Wei (魏) 
During the Zhou Dynasty, Wei (state) (魏) the Ji family acquired the surname Wèi (魏). During the Northern Wei (北魏), Xiaowen family got the surname Wei with the state name.

During the Ming Dynasty, Gao (高) and Li (李) family changed their surname to Wei.  Wei is also a surname used by some Chinese minorities.

In 2019 it was the 45th most common surname in Mainland China.

It is the 30th name on the Hundred Family Surnames poem.
 Vision Wei (魏晨), Chinese singer and actor
 Wei Hongtian, Chinese diplomat
 Wei Wenbo, (魏文伯）Chinese politician and revolutionary)
 Wei Jingsheng (魏京生), Chinese dissident
 Wei Kuo-yen (魏國彥), Minister of Environmental Protection Administration of the Republic of China (2014–2016)
 Wei Ming-ku (魏明谷), Magistrate of Changhua County (2014–2018)
 Wei Qiuyue (魏秋月), Chinese volleyball player
 Wei Tao-ming (魏道明), ambassador, mayor of Nanjing, governor of Taiwan, foreign minister
 Wei Xiaoyuan (魏晓媛), Chinese artistic gymnast
 Wei Yan (魏延), a military officer of Shu during the Three Kingdoms Period
 Wei Yao-chien (魏耀乾), member of Legislative Yuan (1990–1996)
 Wei Yaxin (born 2000), Chinese badminton player
 Empress of Wei Clan consort of the Qianlong Emperor and Empress of the Qing Dynasty
 Wei Yung (魏鏞), Minister of the Research, Development and Evaluation Commission of the Republic of China (1976–1988)
 Wei Zheng (魏徵), the statesman of the Tang Dynasty
 Wei Zhongxian (魏忠賢), eunuch, original name Li Jinzhong
 Ngui Min Fui (魏明惠), Chinese Malaysian Engineer
 Katherine Wei-Sender, Chinese American bridge player and spouse of C. C. Wei
 C. C. Wei (魏重庆), Chinese American bridge player
 Dexter Goei, Chinese-Indonesian American businessman
 Juncheng Wei, mathematician

Notable people surnamed Wei (尉) 
Wèi (尉) family name originated from Wei family of Zheng (郑国), Yu family of Xia Dynasty (复), and Royal of Northern Wei (北魏), and many more.

 Wei Liao (尉缭, Wèi Liáo) – a strategist of Warring States Period, purported writer of the classic military text Wei Liaozi

Notable people surnamed Wei (蔿) 
Wěi (蔿) family name from the Yuan (surname) (薳) the form a Xiong (surname) (熊) of Chu (state).

Other notable people surnamed Wei 
 Belle Wei, American electric engineer and educator

See also 
 Wei (given name)
 List of common Chinese surnames
 Hundred Family Surnames

References 

Chinese-language surnames
Multiple Chinese surnames